This list of sequenced fungi genomes contains all the fungal species known to have publicly available complete genome sequences that have been assembled, annotated and published; draft genomes are not included, nor are organelle only sequences.

Ascomycota

Dothideomycetes 
 Aureobasidium pullulans, A. melanogenum, A. subglaciale and A. namibiae, polyextremotolerant (2014)
 Hortaea werneckii, extremely halotolerant (2013 2017)
 Leptosphaeria maculans, plant pathogen (2011)
  Macrophomina phaseolina, plant pathogen (2012)
 Mycosphaerella fijiensis, plant pathogen (2007)
 Mycosphaerella graminicola IPO323, wheat pathogen (2008)
 Phaeosphaeria nodorum SN15, wheat pathogen (2005)
 Pyrenophora tritici-repentis Pt-1C-BFP, wheat pathogen (2007)

Eurotiomycetes 
 Ajellomyces capsulata several strains, Darling's disease (2009, unpubl.)
 Ajellomyces dermatitidis several strains (2009, unpubl.)
 Arthroderma benhamiae CBS 112371, skin infection (2010, unpubl.)
 Arthroderma gypseum CBS 118893, athlete's foot (2008)
 Arthroderma otae CBS 113480, athlete's foot (2008)
 Aspergillus aculeatus ATCC16872, industrial use (2010)
 Aspergillus carbonarius ITEM 5010, food pathogen (2009)
 Aspergillus clavatus Strain:NRRL1 (2008)
 Aspergillus fumigatus Strain:A1163, human pathogen (2008)
 Aspergillus fumigatus Strain:Af293, human pathogen (2005)
 Aspergillus kawachii IFO 4308, food industry (2011)
 Aspergillus nidulans Strain:FGSC A4, model organism (2005)
 Aspergillus niger Strain:ATCC 1015 (DOE Joint Genome institute)
 Aspergillus niger Strain:CBS 513.88, industrial use (2007)
 Aspergillus oryzae Strain:RIB40, industrial use (2005)
 Aspergillus terreus NIH 2624, statin producer and pathogen (2005, unpubl.)
 Coccidioides immitis, human pathogen, Valley fever (2009)
 Coccidioides posadasii C735 delta SOWgp, human pathogen, Valley fever (2009)
 Neosartorya fischeri Strain:NRRL181 (2008)
 Paracoccidioides brasiliensis, several strains, human pathogen (2007
 Penicillium chrysogenum Strain: Wisconsin54-1255, industrial use (2008)
 Penicillium digitatum Strain PHI26 (2012)
 Penicillium digitatum Strain Pd1 (2012
 Talaromyces marneffei, human pathogen (2011
 Uncinocarpus reesii (2009)

Leotiomycetes 
 Blumeria graminis ffsp hordei Strain:DH14, plant pathogen (2010)
 Botrytis cinerea (Botryotinia fuckeliana) Strain:B05.10 and T4, plant pathogen (2011)
 Glarea lozoyensis (2012)
 Sclerotinia sclerotiorum Strain:1980 (2011)
Ascocoryne sarcoides Strain: NRRL50072 (2012)

Pezizomycetes 
Cladobotryum protrusum (2019)
Tuber melanosporum Mel28, Périgord black truffle (2010)

Saccharomycetes 
 Ashbya gossypii Strain:ATCC 10895, plant pathogen (2004)
 Candida albicans Strain:SC5314, human pathogen (2004)
 Candida albicans Strain:WO-1, human pathogen (2009)
 Candida dubliniensis CD36, human pathogen (2009)
 Candida glabrata Strain:CBS138, human pathogen (2004)
 Candida guilliermondii, human pathogen (2009)
 Candida lusitaniae, human pathogen (2009)
 Candida parapsilosis, human pathogen (2009)
 Candida orthopsilosis, human pathogen (2012)
 Candida tropicalis, human pathogen (2009)
 Debaryomyces hansenii Strain:CBS767, industrial use (2004)
 Debaryomyces hansenii Strain:MTCC 234, salt-tolerant (2012)
 Dekkera bruxellensis Strain:CBS2499, wine yeast (2012)
 Hansenula polymorpha NCYC 495 leu1.1, industrial use (2010)
 Kluyveromyces aestuarii ATCC 18862 (2010, unpubl.)
 Kluyveromyces lactis Strain:CLIB210, industrial use (2004)
 Kluyveromyces wickerhamii UCD 54-210 (2010, unpubl.)
 Lachancea kluyveri (Saccharomyces kluyveri) NRRL Y-12651, plant pathogen (2009)
 Lodderomyces elongisporus, human pathogen (2009)
 Naumovozyma castellii Strain:AS 2.2404, CBS 4309 (Saccharomyces castellii; 2003, 2011)
 Naumovozyma dairenensis Strain:CBS 421 (2011)
 Saccharomyces bayanus (2003, 2011)
 Saccharomyces arboricolus (2013,)
 Saccharomyces cerevisiae Strain:JAY291, industrial/model (2009)
 Saccharomyces cerevisiae Strain:S288C, industrial/model (1996)
 Saccharomyces cerevisiae Strain:Sigma1278b, industrial/model (2010)
 Saccharomyces kudriavzevii (2003)
 Saccharomyces mikatae (2003, 2011)
 Saccharomyces paradoxus (2003 2009)
 Saccharomyces pastorianus Weihenstephan 34/70, industrial, beer (2009)
 Scheffersomyces stipitis (Pichia stipitis) CBS 6054, lignin/xylose degrader (2007)
 Spathaspora passalidarum NRRL Y-27907, model xylose fermenter (2010)
 Tetrapisispora phaffii van der Walt Y 89, CBS 4417 (2011)
 Torulaspora delbrueckii Strain:Wallerstein 129, CBS 1146 (2011)
 Vanderwaltozyma polyspora DSM 70294 (2007)
 Yarrowia lipolytica Strain:CLIB99, industrial use (2004)
 Zygosaccharomyces rouxii strain CBS732, food spoiler (2009)

Schizosaccharomycetes 
 Schizosaccharomyces japonicus yFS275, model for invasive growth (2006)
 Schizosaccharomyces pombe Strain:972h, model eukaryote (2002)

Sordariomycetes 
 Colletotrichum graminicola, corn pathogen (2012)
 Colletotrichum higginsianum, Arabidopsis thaliana pathogen (2012)
 Chaetomium cochliodes Strain:CCM F-232, soil fungus (2016)
 Chaetomium globosum Strain:CBS 148.51, soil fungus (2005)
 Chaetomium thermophilum Strain:CBS 144.50, soil fungus (2011)
 Fusarium oxysporum f. sp. lycopersici 4287, human/plant pathogen (2010)
 Gibberella moniliformis 7600, plant pathogen (2010)
 Gibberella zeae PH-1, plant pathogen (2008)
 Gaeumannomyces graminis tritici R3-111a-1 (2010, unpubl.)
 Grosmannia clavigera kw1407, plant pathogen (2011)
 Magnaporthe grisea, plant pathogen (20054)
 Metarhizium acridum CQMa 102, and
 Metarhizium anisopliae ARSEF 23, insect pathogens (2011)
 Neurospora crassa, model eukaryote (2003)
 Neurospora tetrasperma FGSC 2508 mat A, model (2010)
 Nectria haematococca MPVI, plastic/pest./lignin degrader (2009)
 Podospora anserina :S mat+ 
 Sporotrichum thermophile, thermophilic cellulose degrader (2010)
 Thielavia terrestris, model thermophile/industrial (2010)
 Trichoderma atroviride, industrial/soil, (2010)
 Trichoderma reesei QM6a, biomass-degrading (2008)
 Trichoderma virens Gv29-8, industrial/pathogen (2007)
 Verticillium albo-atrum VaMs.102, plant pathogen (2008, unpubl.)

Basidiomycota

Agaricomycetes 
 Agaricus bisporus var. bisporus Strain:H97, Champignon (2009)
Agrocybe aegerita, ack Poplar or Sword-belt Mushroom (2018)  )
 Auricularia delicata (2012)
Auricularia heimuer, Chinese Auricularia (2019)
 Coniophora puteana (2012)
 Coprinopsis cinerea (Coprinus cinereus), model organism for multicellular fungi (2010)
 Dichomitus squalens (2012)
 Fibroporia radiculosa Strain:TFFH 294 (2012)
 Fomitiporia mediterranea (2012)
 Fomitopsis pinicola (2012)
 Gloeophyllum trabeum (2012)
 Hebeloma cylindrosporum http://genome.jgi.doe.gov/Hebcy2/Hebcy2.home.html
 Heterobasidion annosum, plant pathogen (2009)
 Laccaria bicolor Strain:S238N-H82, mycorrhiza (2008)
Lentinula edodes, Shiitake mushroom (2016)
 Moniliophthora perniciosa, Witches' Broom Disease of cacao (2008)
 Phanerochaete chrysosporium Strain:RP78, mycoremediation (2004)
 Piriformospora indica endophyte (2011)
 Pleurotus ostreatus, industrial/lignin degrader (2010)
Pleurotus tuber-regium, White-rot fungus (2018)
 Postia placenta, cellulose degrader (2008)
 Punctularia strigosozonata (2012)
 Schizophyllum commune, mushroom (2010)
 Serpula lacrymans, plant pathogen (2011)
 Stereum hirsutum (2012)
 Trametes versicolor (2012)
 Wolfiporia cocos (2012)

Pucciniomycetes (formerly Urediniomycetes) 
 Melampsora laricis-populina, pathogen of poplars (2008)
 Puccinia graminis f. sp. tritici, plant pathogen (2011)
 Puccinia triticina 1-1 BBBD Race 1, pathogen of wheat()
 Rhodotorula graminis strain WP1, plant symbiont (2010)
 Sporobolomyces roseus, associated with plants

Tremellomycetes 
 Cryptococcus (Filobasidiella) neoformans JEC21, human pathogen (2005, other strains unpubl.)
 Dacryopinax sp.  (2012)
 Tremella mesenterica (2012)

Ustilaginomycetes 
 Malassezia globosa CBS 7966, dandruff-associated (2007)
 Malassezia restricta CBS 7877, dandruff-associated (2007)
 Sporisorium rellianum, plant pathogen (2010)
 Ustilago maydis, plant pathogen (2006)

Wallemiomycetes 
 Wallemia ichthyophaga, obligate halophile (2013)
 Wallemia sebi, xerophile (2012)

Chytridiomycota 
Chytridiomycota includes fungi with spores that have flagella (zoospores) and are a sister group to more advanced land fungi that lack flagella. Several chytrid species are pathogens, but have not had their genomes sequenced yet.
 Batrachochytrium dendrobatidis JEL423, amphibian pathogen (2006)
 Batrachochytrium dendrobatidis JAM81, amphibian pathogen (2006)
 Spizellomyces punctatus DAOM BR117 (2009)
 Gonapodya prolifera JEL478 (Monoblepharidomycetes) (2011)
[[Chytriomyces]] sp. MP 71
 Entophlycits helioformis JEL805
 Gaertneriomyces semiglobifer Barr43
 Globomyces pollinis-pini 
 Rhizoclomsatium globosum

Blastocladiomycota 
 Allomyces macrogynus ATCC 38327 (Blastocladiomycota) (2009)
 Catenaria anguillulae PL171 (Blastocladiomycota)

Neocallimastigomycota 
 Piromyces sp. E2 (Neocallimastigomycota) (2011)
 Anaeromyces sp. S4 
 Neocallimastix sp. G1
 Orpinomyces sp. C1A

Microsporidia 
 Encephalitozoon cuniculi, human pathogen (2001)
 Encephalitozoon intestinalis ATCC 50506, human pathogen (2010)
 Enterocytozoon bieneusi, human pathogen particularly in the context of HIV infection (~60% of genome 2009, 2010)
 Nosema ceranae, honey bee pathogen (2009)
 Octosporea bayeri OER 3-3, Daphnia pathogen (2009)

Mucoromycota

Mucoromycotina
Absidia padenii
Absidia repens
Backusella circina
Circinella umbellata
Cokeromyces recurvatus
Cunninghamella echinulata
Dichotomocladium elegans
Fennellomyces sp.
Gilbertella persicaria var. persicaria
Gongronella butleri
Hesseltinella vesiculosa
Lichtheimia corymbifera
Lichtheimia hyalospora
Mucor circinelloides
Mucor cordense
Mucor indicus
Mucor heterogamus
Mycotypha africana
Parasitella parasitica
Phascolomyces articulosus
Phycomyces blakesleeanus
Phycomyces nitens
Pilaira anomala
Pilobolus umbonatus
Radiomyces spectabilis
Rhizopus delemar
 Rhizopus oryzae, human pathogen (mucormycosis) (2009)
Rhizopus microsporus
Saksenaea vasiformis
Spinellus fuiger
Sporodiniella umbellata
Syncephalastrum racemosum
Thamnidium elegans
Umbelopsis isabellina
Umbelopsis ramanniana
Zychaea mexicana

Glomeromycotina
Rhizophagus irregularis

Mortierellomycotina
 Mortierella alpina Strain: ATCC 32222, commercial source of arachidonic acid (2011)
Lobosporangium transversale
Mortierella elongata
Mortierella humilis
Mortierella multidivaricata
Mortierella verticillata

Zoopagomycota

Kickxellomycotina
Coemansia reversa
Coemansia spiralis
Kickxella alabastrina
Linderina pennicpora
Martensiomyces pterosporus
Ramicandelaber brevisporus
Smittium culicis
Smittium mucronatum
Zancudomyces culisetae

Entomophthoromycotina
Basidiobolus meristosporus
Conidiobolus coronatus
Condidiobolus thromboides
Massospora cicadina

Zoopagomycotina
Syncephalis fuscata
Syncephalis plumigaleata
Syncephalis pseudoplumigaleata
Piptocephalis cylindrospora

See also 
 List of sequenced animal genomes
 List of sequenced archaeal genomes
 List of sequenced bacterial genomes
 List of sequenced eukaryotic genomes
 List of sequenced plant genomes

External links 
Fungal Genome Initiative (includes draft genomes)
UniProt query (complete proteome and fungi)

References 

Lists of fungi
Biology-related lists
Fungi